Oued Taria District is a district of Mascara Province, Algeria.

Municipalities
The district is further divided into 2 municipalities:
Oued Taria
Guerdjoum

Districts of Mascara Province